Dame Irene Lucas-Hays  (née Lucas; born 4 February 1954) is a British businesswoman and former civil servant, and the chair of Hays Travel, the largest independent travel agent in the UK, which she jointly owned with her husband John Hays until his death in 2020.

Early life
She was born Irene Lucas in Newcastle upon Tyne on 4 February 1954, the daughter of Vincent and Isabelle Lucas.

Career
Hays worked in local government, rising to chief executive of South Tyneside Council and Sunderland City Council. She was later an advisor to Ministers and Secretaries of State in Whitehall, and a Permanent Secretary. In 1980, her late husband John founded Hays Travel in the back of his mother's children's wear store in Seaham, Durham. John Hays owned 56.42% and Irene owns 43.58%. 

Hays has been the chair of Hays Travel since 2011. Since January 2019, Hays has been a non-executive board member and chair of the Education and Skills Funding Agency (ESFA) management board.

Honours
She was appointed Commander of the Order of the British Empire (CBE) in the 2008 New Year Honours for services to local government and Dame Commander of the Order of the British Empire (DBE) in the 2021 New Year Honours for services to training, education and young people.

In December 2018, she was awarded an honorary doctorate by the University of Sunderland. Hays has been awarded an honorary MBA. She was appointed a Deputy Lieutenant of Tyne & Wear in 2020.

Personal life
In 1997, she married John Hays, and they have one son and one daughter. John was the company's CEO. John Hays died on 13 November 2020, after collapsing from a cardiac arrest at the company's Sunderland head office.

References

Living people
1940s births
British women business executives
Civil servants in the Department for Communities and Local Government
British Permanent Secretaries
Dames Commander of the Order of the British Empire
Deputy Lieutenants of Tyne and Wear